Benavente is a municipality and parish in Santarém District in Portugal. The population in 2011 was 29,019, in an area of 521.38 km².

History
In 1199 the fixation of foreign settlers on the left bank of the Tagus River created a Town on a peninsula in the tagus estuary. Situated in the western limits of Coruche castle dominion, subordinate to the Order of Calatrava. This small settlement remained under the Seignory of this Military Order, which named it Benavente, the same name as a castle of the same Military order in the Kingdom of León (Benavente, Zamora). 
It received its foral on March 25, 1200, given by D. Paio (or Pelágio), master of the Military Order of Santa Maria of Évora. The foral was confirmed in Santarém in 1218 by Sancho I. King Manuel gave it a new foral on January 16, 1516.

The present Mayor is Carlos Coutinho, elected by the Unitary Democratic Coalition (Communist and Green coalition).

Benavente is crossed by National Road 118, which divides the town's historical centre on the west side, destroyed by an earthquake on 27 April 1909, and the new town built after the quake on the east.

The municipal holiday is Ascension Day.

Economy
Agriculture, livestock farming, forestry, and food industries are the main activities. The Companhia das Lezírias is headquartered in the municipality, in Samora Correia.

Parishes
Administratively, the municipality is divided into 4 civil parishes (freguesias):
 Barrosa
 Benavente
 Samora Correia
 Santo Estêvão

Notable people 
 Maria João Bastos (born 1975) a Portuguese actress, best known in Brazil.
 Filipe Morais (born 1985) a UK based footballer with over 370 club caps 
 João Barradas (born 1992) a Portuguese accordionist and composer
 Gonçalo Guedes (born 1996) is footballer with over 180 club caps and 23 for Portugal

References

External links
Town Hall official website
Photos from Benavente

Towns in Portugal
Populated places in Santarém District
Municipalities of Santarém District